Berteaucourt-les-Dames is a commune in the Somme department in Hauts-de-France in northern France.

Geography
The commune is situated at the junction of the D12 and the D57 roads, between Amiens and  Abbeville.

Population

Places of interest
 Benedictine Abbey of St. Mary (Abbaye Sainte-Marie de Berteaucourt).

See also
Communes of the Somme department

References

External links

A website about the abbey (French)

Communes of Somme (department)